Happy's Place was an afternoon children's television program that aired on WFFT-TV Super 55 Fox in Fort Wayne, Indiana in the 1980s and 1990s.

Background
The program was known for its two-hour block of children's programming (in later supplied by the Fox Network) that initially aired from 3 to 5 in the afternoon. In the mid to late 1980s, programming included DuckTales, Inspector Gadget, The Smurfs, He-Man, Saber Rider and G.I. Joe. The original program was called Happy's Hour which began broadcasting in 1976 on WTVQ, Channel 62 in Lexington, KY, with Tim Eppenstein playing the character of Happy and Mike McMellon providing the voice of Froggie.

During programming breaks, Happy, who was a clown dressed as a hobo, would do children's activities from the WFFT studios. In the show, he had a sidekick named Froggie, a frog puppet (voiced by Craig Beaverson). Froggie had his own morning program on WFFT Super 55 Fox, entitled Froggie's Pad. Froggie's Pad featured children's cartoons such as ThunderCats and SilverHawks. Later on, Chester T. Fox (Paul Moring) and Lawn Boy (Rick Miller) were added.

History
The original program was called Happy's Hour which began broadcasting in 1976 on WTVQ, Channel 62 in Lexington, KY, with Tim Eppenstein playing the character of Happy and Mike McMellon providing the voice of Froggie. The voice of Froggie was later provided by Greg Rice. Eppenstein, McMellon, and Rice all reunited in 2011 for the documentary film When Happy Met Froggie, which reunited the cast and crew of the show. The documentary film also featured interviews with actresses Lana Wood and Morgan Brittany, who made guests appearances on the original television show.

Charles Willer was slated to be the first Happy, but he turned the job down when WFFT asked him to retire his other locally-known clown character, Chuckles the Clown, as a condition of employment.  The original Happy was then played by Mike Fry, a television show host-turned inventor. Fry left the show in 1990 to concentrate on the gourmet fortune cookie company he started with girlfriend Kim Harvey in 1988.

Happy's Place was visited by "Cousin" Happy (Chris Danielson), dressed in the same hobo apparel when the original Happy blew out his knee and needed surgery. This injury was the result of Mike slipping off the roof of the "Happymobile"—a customized golf cart—during Fort Wayne's Three Rivers Festival Parade in 1988. A new "Happy" (Phillip Colglazier, now the executive director of the Fort Wayne Civic Theatre) eventually joined the show when Mike Fry left to pursue his inventing career. That Happy eventually left the show to a fourth Happy the Hobo (Adrian Guenther), who went on to work for WPTA-TV.

The show featured an in-studio audience, in which children met Happy on TV during breaks between programs in a single file line. Children were chosen to play games on the show. Parents had a place to sit on the side and were not shown to be part of the TV audience. When the kids were leaving after the show was over, they were all given goodie bags containing treats like Pop Weaver microwave popcorn, Astro Pops suckers, and Archway Cookies.

From 1981 to 1997 Happy's Place was a live program, and no recordings of Happy's Place were saved by WFFT, however there are some episodes on YouTube.

The best known theme song of the show was a song by KC & The Sunshine Band - "Give It Up" 

Mike Fry (aka the original Happy) died on the 5th of November, 2012 at Indiana University Health University Hospital of an autoimmune disease.

References

1980s American children's television series
1990s American children's television series
Local children's television programming in the United States
American television shows featuring puppetry
Television shows about clowns